The Estate of Boa Hora is an agricultural property and manor house in the civil parish of Terra Chã, municipality of Angra do Heroísmo, in the Portuguese archipelago of the Azores.

History

For many centuries the estate was the personal residence of the Barcelos dynasty, a family of landed gentry and rich merchants. 

It was the home of Isidro Barcelos Bettencourt, a Portuguese politician and party member of the PNR Partido Nacional Republicano (National Republican Party) in Angra do Heroísmo, and functionary of the Portuguese government.

Architecture
The manorhouse is a large two-story building or considerable dimensions, with patio and garden (oriented to the east) containing various exotic plants of considerable dimensions and age. The buildings also include a private chapel.

This signeurial building, with austere facade, is also marked by various flourishes, including the obvious pinnacle over the main gate of sculpted stone.

Buildings and structures in Angra do Heroísmo
Manor houses in the Azores